Osmerus  is a genus of smelt.

Species
There are currently three recognized species in this genus:
 Osmerus eperlanus (Linnaeus, 1758) (European smelt)
 Osmerus mordax (Mitchill, 1814)
 Osmerus mordax dentex Steindachner & Kner, 1870 (Arctic rainbow smelt)
 Osmerus mordax mordax (Mitchill, 1814) (Rainbow smelt)
 Osmerus spectrum Cope, 1870 (Pygmy smelt)

References

 
Extant Thanetian first appearances
Taxa named by Carl Linnaeus
Ray-finned fish genera
Taxonomy articles created by Polbot